Mila is an unincorporated community in Northumberland County, in the U.S. state of Virginia.

References

Unincorporated communities in Virginia
Unincorporated communities in Northumberland County, Virginia

It is surrounded by various communities; Sandy Point, Northumberland County, Virginia, Surprise Hill, Blackwells, Lilian.